Sulus is a rural locality (a station) in Daktuyskoye Rural Settlement of Magdagachinsky District, Amur Oblast, Russia. The population was 31 as of 2018. There is 1 street.

Geography 
The village is located 9 km from Daktuy and 40 km from Magdagachi.

References 

Rural localities in Magdagachinsky District